= Haymount, Virginia =

Unincorporated community in Virginia, United States

Coordinates: 38°12′13″N 77°15′08″W

Haymount is an unincorporated community in Caroline County, in the U.S. state of Virginia.
